Marty is mainly a masculine given name, often a short form (hypocorism) of Martin. Notable people and fictional characters with the name include:

People
 Marty Barrett (second baseman) (born 1958), former Major League Baseball player
 Marty Booker (born 1976), National Football League player
 Franchester Martin Marty Brennaman (born 1942), American sportscaster
 Martin Marty Casey (born 1973), lead singer, songwriter and second guitarist of the band Lovehammers
 Martin Marty Cordova (born 1969), American former Major League Baseball player
 Marty Ehrlich (born 1955), American jazz musician
 Martin Marty Feldman (1934–1982), English writer, comedian and actor
 Max Marty Friedman (basketball) (1889–1986), American Hall-of-Fame professional basketball player and coach
 Martin Marty Friedman (born 1962), American guitarist
 Martin Marty Glickman (1917–2001), American Olympic sprinter, All-American football player and sports announcer
 Marty Hurney (born 1955), American football executive
 Marty Jannetty (born 1962), American professional wrestler
 Marty Krofft (born 1937), television producer
 Martin Marty Liquori (born 1949), American middle distance runner
 Marty Markowitz (born 1945), American politician, former New York State Senator and Borough President of Brooklyn
 Martin Marty McSorley (born 1963), Canadian retired National Hockey League player
 Martin Marty Meehan (born 1956), American attorney, politician and law professor, President of the University of Massachusetts
 Mohammad Marty Natalegawa (born 1963), Indonesian diplomat and politician
 Marty Mornhinweg (born 1962), National Football League quarterback coach and former head coach 
 Martin Marty Nothstein (born 1971), American professional cyclist
 Martin Marty Peretz (born 1938), American publisher
 Marty Puccio (born 1973), American murderer
 Marty Reisman (born 1930), American table tennis champion
 Marty Riessen (born 1941), American tennis player
 Marty Ross (musician), (born 1959), American musician
 Martin Marty Schottenheimer (1943–2021), American former National Football League head coach
 Martin Marty Seifert (born 1972), American politician, former Republican Minority Leader of the Minnesota House of Representatives
 John Martin Marty Stuart (born 1958), American country music singer
 Marty Turco (born 1975), Canadian National Hockey League goaltender
 Martin Marty Wendell (1926–2012), American football player

Stage name
 Marty Allen, born Morton David Alpern (1922–2018), American stand-up comedian and actor
 Marty Balin, born Martyn Jerel Buchwald (1942–2018), American rock singer, musician and co-founder of the band Jefferson Airplane
 Marty Grebb, born Martin Grebb (1945–2020), American musician, member of The Buckinghams
 Marty Robbins, born Martin David Robinson (1925–1982), American country music singer, songwriter and musician
 Marty Wilde, born Reginald Leonard Smith in 1939, English singer and songwriter
 Marty (rapper), born Martin Lorenzo Santiago in 1987, American Christian hip-hop musician

Fictional characters
 Marty Duko, a detective in the television series Orphan Black
 Marty Glouberman, a recurring character in the Netflix adult animated series Big Mouth
 Marty Maraschino, a member of the Pink Ladies in the musical Grease and in the movie Grease
 Marty McFly, the main character of the Back to the Future film trilogy
 Marty Murray (Brookside), on the British soap opera Brookside
 Marty Saybrooke, on the American soap opera One Life to Live
 Marty Stieber, in the SSX snowboarding video game series
 Marty Taylor, Tim Taylor's younger brother from the  American television sitcom Home Improvement 
 Marty Wolf, a filmmaker and the main antagonist of Big Fat Liar
 Marty the Zebra, in the Madagascar series of animated films
 Marty, nicknamed Marty from the Party, a recurring character and Buffy's love interest in Disney Channel series Andi Mack
 Marty, the main protagonist of the animated series Eon Kid
 Marty, in the American television sitcom Gimme a Break

Masculine given names
Hypocorisms